The Silverstrand Beach is small narrow beach located in Clear Water Bay Peninsula, Sai Kung, Hong Kong.

Management
Like many other beaches in Hong Kong, it is managed by the Leisure and Cultural Services Department. A wide range of facilities are available, including car parking facilities, refreshment kiosks, barbecue pits, changing rooms and shower facilities. Life guard and first aid service hours are 9am-6pm April to October and 8am-7pm on weekends and on public holidays from June to August.

Water quality
The Silverstrand Beach, is currently graded as one of the Grade 2 water quality beaches in Hong Kong by the Environmental Protection Department.

Shark attack
There have been two fatal shark attacks on record at Silverstrand beach:
11 June 1993, 60-year-old man Kwong Guang-Hing lost his right arm and left leg and succumbed to his injuries.
8 June 1991, 65-year-old woman Leung Kam-Ho was bitten on her right leg and waist and died.

References

Clear Water Bay Peninsula
Beaches of Hong Kong